Furnace is a 2007 horror film written and directed by William Butler.  It stars Danny Trejo, Michael Paré, Tom Sizemore, Ja Rule, and Paul Wall.

Plot

A group of prisoners are assigned to assist in the re-opening of an old prison's closed wing.  They find that the furnace room in the wing is the location of a murder, and the victim's spirit seeks death of those who enter the room.

Cast
 Michael Paré as Detective Michael Turner
 Ja Rule as Terrence Dufresne
 Jenny McShane as Dr. Ashley Carter
 Danny Trejo as Fury
 Tom Sizemore as Frank Miller
 Kelly Stables as Karen Bolding
 Paul Wall as Joey Robbins

Production
The original script for Furnace was written by Anghus Houvouras, and the project was brought up to director William Butler, who thought that the story was reminiscent of the 1988 film Prison.  Butler signed to direct, and he and his writing partner Aaron Strongoni collaborated to polish the script to meet Melee Entertainment's budgetary concerns.  The rewriting lasted six months and changed the story substantially.  Butler said of the change, "This of course was no reflection on Anghus, but instead the team of people at Melee that sort of took the film in another direction."

Release

The film was released on DVD by Melee Studio on February 12, 2008.

Reception

Critical reception for the film has been mostly negative.

Dread Central awarded the film a score of 2.5 / 5 stating "All in all, Furnace is just another blah horror entry to clutter the direct-to-DVD market. As if the floating head cover weren't enough on its own to dissuade you from picking it up believe me, this furnace is just blowing smoke".
David Johnson from DVD Verdict gave the film a negative review criticizing the film's first half as being too slow and stated that the film would likely disappoint horror fans.

References

External links
 
 
 

2007 direct-to-video films
2007 horror films
2000s ghost films
2000s supernatural horror films
American supernatural horror films
Direct-to-video horror films
2007 films
Films set in prison
2000s English-language films
Films directed by William Butler (actor)
2000s American films